The Parade Ground Metro Station is located on the Blue Line of the Hyderabad Metro in India. It is part of Corridor I of the Hyderabad Metro starting from Miyapur and was opened to the public on 28 November 2017. Parade Ground metro station act as inter-change between two routes- Faluknuma to Jubilee Bus Stand, and the other from Hitec City —to Nagole.

History 
It was opened on 28 November 2017

Facilities

References

Hyderabad Metro stations